The Príncipe sunbird (Anabathmis hartlaubii) is a species of bird in the family Nectariniidae. It is endemic to Príncipe island.

References

Príncipe sunbird
Endemic birds of São Tomé and Príncipe
Endemic fauna of Príncipe
Príncipe sunbird
Taxonomy articles created by Polbot